Eva Minor  (born 21 January 1969) is a German former footballer. She was a member of the Germany women's national football team in 1987, playing 1 match. On club level she played for VfR 09 Saarbrücken.

References

External links
 
 Profile at soccerdonna.de

1969 births
Living people
German women's footballers
Place of birth missing (living people)
Germany women's international footballers
Women's association football defenders